PNN may refer to:

National Natural Parks System (Colombia) (PNN; "Parques Nacionales Naturales"), the Colombian governmental agency responsible for the country's national park system
Parliamentary and News Network, Australia
Princeton Municipal Airport (Maine), USA (by IATA code)
Probabilistic neural network, a machine learning algorithm
Pinin (PNN protein) the protein encoded by the PNN gene
Hagahai language (ISO 639 code: pnn)
VOA-PNN (Persian News Network) Voice of America
 Planetary nebula nucleus (PNN), see planetary nebula
Perineuronal net, a component of the extracellular matrix

See also

Pinin (disambiguation)